Cultural Endowment of Estonia (abbreviated Kulka or KULKA; also translated as Estonian Cultural Capital) is an Estonian foundation which supports activities related to Estonian culture. The foundation was established in 1925 and re-established in 1994.

The foundation was established in 1925 after the Estonian Parliament passed the Cultural Endowment of Estonia Act. It was decided that scholarships are to be given twice a year: on 1 April and on 1 October.

The foundation was re-established in 1994 after the Estonian Parliament passed a new Cultural Endowment of Estonia Act.

The foundation gives also literary awards and a yearly prize.

References

Further reading
 Jüri Ujas "Eesti Kultuurkapital 1921-1941"
 Jüri Uljas. Kultuurkapitali uus tulemine. Sirp, 24 July 2009

External links
 

Estonian culture
Cultural organizations based in Estonia
Organizations established in 1925